The 2017–18 Khuzestan Premier League season was the 18th season of the Khuzestan Premier League which took place from September 6, 2017 to March 14, 2018 with 16 teams competing from the province of Khuzestan. This was the first year that the league increased its teams from 14 to 16. Teams played home and away with one another each playing 30 matches. Esteghlal Novin Mahshahr finished the season on top of the standings and was promoted to division 3 of the Iranian football system. Meanwhile, finishing in last place, Shahbaz Shadegan will be relegated to the Khuzestan Division 1 league.

League changes
With 5 teams being relegated down from Division 3, the Khuzestan Football Association announced that the league will be expanded from 14 to 16 teams in an effort to accommodate the relegated teams. Since only 1 team is promoted every year to Division 3, the 5 relegated teams would have created an unbalanced league under the 14 team system.

Teams

Final standings

Results

See also 

 2017–18 Azadegan League
 2017–18 League 2
 2017–18 League 3
 2017–18 Hazfi Cup
 2017 Iranian Super Cup

References 

Khuzestan Premier League
1
Iran